Adela of Flanders (also Ala and Alana in southern Italian sources) (c. 1064 – April 1115), was Queen consort of Denmark by marriage to King Canute IV and duchess of Apulia by marriage to Duke Roger Borsa, and then regent of Apulia from 1111 to 1115 as mother and guardian of Duke William II.

Life
Adela was born the daughter of Robert I, Count of Flanders, and Gertrude of Saxony. In 1080, she married King Canute IV of Denmark. The marriage was arranged as a part of an alliance between Flanders and Denmark against William the Conqueror. During this marriage, she had three children: a son, later Count Charles the Good (born in 1084), and twin daughters, Cecilia and Ingegerd (born ca. 1085/86). When Canute was assassinated in 1086, she fled with her son to Flanders, leaving her daughters behind in Denmark.

She stayed in the court of her father and brother Robert II until 1092, when she left for Italy to marry Roger Borsa, Duke of Apulia. She bore her second husband three sons: Louis (who died in infancy in 1094), the future Duke William II (born ca. 1096/97) and Guiscard (who died in boyhood in 1108). She acted as a regent for her son William II at the death of Roger Borsa from 1111 until he came of age in 1114.

References

Sources

External links
Adela von Flandern (in German)

House of Flanders
1060s births
1115 deaths
Danish royal consorts
Hauteville family
12th-century women rulers
12th-century Danish people
12th-century Danish women
11th-century Danish people
11th-century Danish women
Remarried royal consorts
Duchesses of Apulia